Michael W. Doyle is an American international relations scholar who is a theorist of the liberal "democratic peace" and author of Liberalism and World Politics.  He has also written on the comparative history of empires and the evaluation of UN peace-keeping. He is a University professor of International Affairs, Law and Political Science at Columbia University - School of International and Public Affairs. He is the former director of Columbia Global Policy Initiative.  He co-directs the Center on Global Governance at Columbia Law School.

Early life
Michael W. Doyle was born in Honolulu, HI and graduated from Jesuit High School in Tampa, FL He earned his AB, AM, and PhD in political science, all from Harvard University.

Career
Doyle has taught at the University of Warwick, Johns Hopkins University, Princeton University, and Yale Law School.  At Princeton University, he directed the Center of International Studies and chaired the Editorial Board and the Committee of Editors of World Politics. He has long been a member and is the former chair of the board of the International Peace Institute.  He was also a member of the External Research Advisory Committee of the UNHCR and the Advisory Committee of the Lessons-Learned Unit of the Department of Peace-Keeping Operations (UN).  He is a member of Council of Foreign Relations, New York.

Kant's Perpetual Peace
In his 1983 essay Kant, Liberal Legacies and Foreign Affairs, Doyle builds on Immanuel Kant's views on various issues; especially noted are his views on liberal internationalism.  Doyle discusses the two legacies of modern liberalism: the pacification of foreign relations among liberal states (see below) and international imprudence.

Awards and honors
In 2001, Doyle was elected a fellow of the American Academy of Arts and Sciences and, in 2009, to the American Philosophical Society.  In 2009, he received the American Political Science Association's Charles E. Merriam Award, which is biennially given to "a person whose published work and career represent a significant contribution to the art of government through the application of social science research." In 2011, Doyle received the Hubert H. Humphrey Award from the American Political Science Association for "notable public service by a political scientist." In 2012, he was named the Daniel Patrick Moynihan Fellow of the American Academy of Political and Social Science. In 2014, he received an honorary degree from the University of Warwick.

Public service
Doyle served as Assistant Secretary-General and Special Advisor to United Nations Secretary-General Kofi Annan.  In the Secretary General's Executive Office, he was responsible for strategic planning, including the Millennium Development Goals, outreach to the international corporate sector through the Global Compact, and relations with Washington.  He is the former chair of the Academic Council on the United Nations System.

He was also the chair of United Nations Democracy Fund from 2007 to 2013, elected by the members and appointed by UN Secretary-General Ban Ki-moon.

Model International Mobility Convention 
As the director of the Columbia Global Policy Initiative's, Doyle convened the group of experts who developed the Model International Mobility Convention.

Now a Carnegie Council project, MIMC is building a Network that will encourage support for and develop the convention in order to address emerging international mobility challenges, including pandemic disease and climate stress.

The Model International Mobility Convention fills a gap in international law by covering the multiple forms of international mobility, ranging from visitors through labor migrants to forced migrants and refugees. It proposes a comprehensive framework for international mobility with the goal of establishing a cumulative set of rights afforded to internationally mobile people (and the corresponding rights and responsibilities of states).

Personal life
Doyle is married to Amy Gutmann, US Ambassador to Germany and the former President of the University of Pennsylvania.  Their daughter, Abigail Doyle, is a professor of chemistry at UCLA.

References

Publications
The Question of Intervention: John Stuart Mill and the Responsibility to Protect (Yale Press)
Ways of War and Peace: Realism, Liberalism, and Socialism (W.W. Norton)
Empires (Cornell University Press)
Liberal Peace: Selected Essays (Routledge)
UN Peacekeeping in Cambodia: UNTAC's Civil Mandate (Lynne Rienner Publishers)
Striking First: Preemption and Prevention of International Conflict (Princeton Press)
Making War and Building Peace (Princeton Press) with Nicholas Sambanis
Alternatives to Monetary Disorder (Council on Foreign Relations/McGraw Hill) with Fred Hirsch and Edward Morse
Keeping the Peace (Cambridge University Press) edited with Ian Johnstone and Robert Orr
Peacemaking and Peacekeeping for the New Century (Rowman and Littlefield) edited with Olara Otunnu
New Thinking in International Relations Theory (Westview) edited with John Ikenberry
The Globalization of Human Rights (United Nations University Press) edited with Jean-Marc Coicaud and Anne-Marie Gardner

External links
 Member Profile, Committee on Global Thought at Columbia University
 Interview with Michael W. Doyle by Theory Talks (16 Apr 2008)
 Article with Michael W. Doyle by Foreign Policy, "One World, Rival Theories" (26 Oct 2009)
Interview with Michael W. Doyle on the background of “Doyle’s Law” given on the occasion of receiving an honorary degree from the University of Warwick (Jul 2014)
 Article with Michael W. Doyle by Columbia Law School, "Professor Michael Doyle Calls Upon Students for Assistance in Creating a Model International Mobility Treaty" (1 Sep 2015)
 Interview with Michael W. Doyle by Columbia News, "Michael Doyle Brings Diverse Experts Together to Solve Global Policy Problems" (15 Oct 2015)
 Video with Michael W. Doyle by C-SPAN, "The Question of Intervention," (18 Feb 2016)

1948 births
Harvard College alumni
Living people
American political scientists
Columbia University faculty
Columbia Law School faculty
International relations scholars
Political liberals (international relations)
Jesuit High School (Tampa) alumni
Harvard Graduate School of Arts and Sciences alumni